Wedding Album is a studio album by Leon Russell and his then wife, Mary Russell, otherwise known as Mary McCreary.  It was the first album released on Leon Russell's record label, Paradise Records, which was distributed by Warner Bros. Records. Leon and Mary Russell are also credited as producers of the album, with the exception of the final track, "Daylight", which was produced by its writer, Bobby Womack.

Russell and Mary Russell performed "Satisfy You" on Saturday Night Live on May 15, 1976.

Track listing
All songs written by Leon Russell except as indicated.

Side one
"Rainbow in Your Eyes"  4:08
"Like a Dream Come True"  2:14
"Love's Supposed To Be that Way" (L. & M. Russell)  3:15
"Fantasy"  3:58
"Satisfy You"  4:39

Side two
"You Are on My Mind"  2:42
"Lavender Blue (Dilly Dilly)" (Eliot Daniel, Larry Morey)  4:34
"Quiet Nights" (L. Russell, Julius Wechter)  3:16
"Windsong"   3:32
"Daylight" (Bobby Womack)  3:21

Charts

Personnel
 Leon Russell - lead and background vocals, synthesizer, piano, bass, RMI Electra Piano, guitar, percussion, vibes, electronic pipe organ
 Mary Russell - lead and background vocals, synthesizer, percussion, piano
 Teddy Jack Eddy (Gary Busey) drums, handclaps
 Steve Douglas - flute ensemble
 Dennis Mansfield - drums
 Richard Torrance - acoustic guitar
 Roger Linn - electric, acoustic and slide guitars
 David Miner - bass guitar
 Robert Wilson - bass guitar (on "You Are on My Mind")
 Jim Horn - saxophone
 Marty Grebb - saxophone
 Julius Wechter - marimba ensemble, piano (on "Quiet Nights")
 Gregg Thomas - bird of paradise mating call (on "Quiet Nights"), drums
 Ambrose Campbell - congas, Nigerian folklore (on "Windsong")
 Willie Weeks - bass guitar (on "Daylight")
 Nigel Olsson - drums (on "Daylight")
 Gary Rowles - guitar (on "Daylight")
 Truman Thomas - electric piano (on "Daylight")
Bobby Womack - electric and acoustic guitars (on "Daylight")

References

Leon Russell albums
1976 albums
Albums produced by Leon Russell
Albums produced by Bobby Womack